The Gordon School is a coeducational, independent school located in East Providence, Rhode Island. Students are educated from nursery through eighth grade. It is located on a   site.

Mission statement
The Gordon School is a racially diverse nursery through eighth grade coeducational independent school in East Providence, Rhode Island. Child by child, the Gordon School community cultivates successful students by inspiring joyful learning, encouraging intellectual leadership, fostering an empathic spirit and stimulating a drive for positive societal impact.

History
The Gordon School was founded by Dr. Helen West Cooke in 1910 in her home in Providence’s East Side.  The school relocated to its current campus in 1963.  The 1963 campus was designed by William D. Warner, the architect that went on to create several high-profile area projects, including Providence's Waterplace Park and the iWay Bridge. It was the first coeducational independent school in Rhode Island. A regulation playing field was extensively renovated during the summer of 2006. From 2010 to 2015, the Teacher Residency Program at Gordon School and Roger Williams University offered a one-year master's degree program.

Notable achievements
In 2012, the Gordon MathCounts team placed 4th in Rhode Island. One student came in the top 10 scorers. In 2015, the MathCounts team placed 3rd in the state. Two seventh graders placed third and fifth. In 2016, the team won the state competition, with one team member winning the individual round, and five team members placing in the top 12. In 2017, the team finished 3rd in the Rhode Island competition. One team member finished 2nd overall in the written portion as well as in the countdown round of the competition to advance to the national competition in Orlando, FL. In 2018, they finished 1st in the state, along with an 8th grader and 6th grader finishing in 1st and 3rd overall, respectively.

Karan S. Takhar won the Rhode Island heat of both the 2003 and 2005 National Geographic bee and represented the state in the national finals. In 2016, the school champion finished 3rd in the Rhode Island GeoBee competition. In 2017, the Gordon School champion lost in the final round and placed 2nd in the state competition.

The Gordon School’s competitive robotics team won the Director's Award in the Rhode Island FIRST LEGO League competition, as well as a Young Environmentalist Award from Save the Bay in early 2006. In the 2006 World Festival in Atlanta, Georgia, against 80 teams from 15 countries, they finished second in the programming category.

Students' work with the pond and stream on campus, as well as nearby Narragansett Bay, has earned the school regional attention from environmental education groups. Along with the 2006 Save the Bay award mentioned above, the school also earned the Environment Council of Rhode Island's Loraine Tisdale Environmental Education Award in 2007. Other environmental education efforts include a partnership with Farm Fresh Rhode Island and participation in International Coastal Cleanup Day and the Children's Garden Network.

Since the mid-1990s, Gordon has established itself as a leader among independent schools that are strengthening their racial diversity and multicultural classroom practice. Gordon administrators have consulted with dozens of schools. Gordon faculty have also presented programs like the eighth grade "Civil Rights Trip" to Georgia and Alabama at the annual NAIS People of Color Conference, and earned the NAIS 2004 Leading Edge Program award for Equity and Justice.

Notable alumni

 David Aldrich, artist and architect
 Jared Donaldson, professional tennis player

Notable faculty
Ruth Tripp, music

References
Notes

External links
 	
 Official site
 Gordon's page in the Children's Garden Network
 Gordon's page with Farm Fresh Rhode Island
 GreatSchools

Private elementary schools in Rhode Island
Private middle schools in Rhode Island
Buildings and structures in East Providence, Rhode Island
Schools in Providence County, Rhode Island